Peter Rainier may refer to:

 Peter Rainier (Royal Navy officer, born 1741), British Admiral
 Peter Rainier (Royal Navy officer, born 1784), British Captain, nephew of the above

See also 
 Peter Rainer, German violinist